Stanley Girls High School is a missionary girls school located in Hyderabad, Telangana, India.

  It has two branches one near Abids and Malakpet It is administered by the Centenary Methodist Church, Hyderabad of India.

History
American missionary Ms. Alice Evans was the school's first principal, which opened in 1896 with a donation from Elizabeth K Stanley. The school reached its centenary in 1996, completing 100 years. The school was established in Hyderabad State, the then princely state of Nizam of Hyderabad. It was one of the Famous Schools in Hyderabad during those days. The school also has Junior, Degree and Engineering colleges. Actress Dia Mirza have attended the college for Junior level courses. The school ground has hosted Nandi Awards twice. The School follows the curriculum as per the 10th level state Government Exams conducted by Andhra Pradesh Board of Secondary Education. The school is located just opposite to Telangana State Board of Secondary Education, the seat of the Directorate of Governmental Exams.

Alumni
 Padma Kuppa, State Representative of Michigan's 41st House of Representatives district in the United States
 Madhavi (actress) - Bollywood actress of the 1970s and 1980s
 K. Kavitha - TRS activist and daughter of Kalvakuntla Chandrashekar Rao
 Sherlyn Chopra - actress
 Dia Mirza - Bollywood actress, attended Junior College

See also
Education in India
List of schools in India
List of institutions of higher education in Telangana

References

External links
http://www.stanleygirlshighschoolabids.in
 http://stanleygirlshighschoolmalakpet.in

High schools and secondary schools in Hyderabad, India
Educational institutions established in 1896
Girls' schools in Telangana
Methodist schools
Establishments in Hyderabad State
1896 establishments in India